Fritz originated as a German nickname for Friedrich, or Frederick (Der Alte Fritz, and Stary Fryc were common nicknames for King Frederick II of Prussia and Frederick III, German Emperor) as well as for similar names including Fridolin and, less commonly, Francis. Fritz (Fryc) was also a name given to German troops by the Entente powers equivalent to the derogative Tommy. Other common bases for which the name Fritz was used include the surnames Fritsche, Fritzsche, Fritsch, Frisch(e) and Frycz.

Below is a list of notable people with the name "Fritz."

Surname
Amanda Fritz (born 1958), retired registered psychiatric nurse and politician from Oregon
Al Fritz (1924–2013), American businessman
Ben Fritz (born 1981), American baseball coach
Betty Jane Fritz (1924–1994), one of the original players in the All-American Girls Professional Baseball League
Clemens Fritz (born 1980), German footballer
Edmund Fritz (before 1918–after 1932), Austrian actor, film director, and music manager
Elisabet Fritz (died 1752), Swedish industrialist
Florian Fritz (born 1984), French rugby union player
Frank Fritz, co-star of History Channel's American Pickers
John Fritz, (1822–1913), American pioneer of iron and steel technology
Jürgen Fritz (born 1953), German musician, keyboard player in the rock band Triumvirat
Lanja Fritz (born 1995), Nauruan sprinter
Madeleine Fritz (1896–1990), Canadian palaeontologist
Nel Fritz (born 1937), Dutch Olympic gymnast
Oscar M. Fritz (1878–1957), American jurist
Reinhold Fritz (1884–1950), German bass-baritone
Roger Fritz (1936–2021), German actor, director, producer and photographer
Sophie Wolff-Fritz (1858–1938), German composer, singer and teacher
Taylor Fritz (born 1997), American professional tennis player
William Harold Fritz (1928–2009), Geologist with the Geological Survey of Canada
Willie Fritz (born 1960), American football coach

Given name
Francis "Fritz" Barzilauskas (1920–1990), American National Football League player
 Fritz Bauer (1903–1968), German Jewish judge and prosecutor who initiated the Auschwitz trials and aided the capture of Adolf Eichmann
 Fritz Baumgarten (1883-1966), German artist, author, and children's author-illustrator
Fritz Bayerlein (1899–1970), German World War II general
Fritz Bondroit (1912–1974), German canoeist
Fritz Buntrock (1909–1948), German SS officer at Auschwitz concentration camp executed for war crimes
Frederico Fritz d'Orey (born 1938), Brazilian racing driver
Fritz Dietrich (Nazi) (1898–1948), German Nazi SS officer executed for war crimes
Siegfried "Fritz" Flesch (1872–1939), Austrian Olympic medalist sabre fencer
Fritz Haber (1868–1934), German chemist and Nobel Prize winner
Fritz Haeg (born 1969), American artist
Fritz Hartjenstein (1905–1954), German Nazi SS concentration camp commandant
Frederick Henderson (born 1958), American executive and former CEO of General Motors
Fritz John (1910–1994), German mathematician
Fritz Klein (1888–1945), German Nazi doctor hanged for war crimes 
Fritz Knöchlein (1911–1949), German Nazi SS commandant executed for war crimes
Friedrich Fritz Kreisler (1875–1962), Austrian violinist and composer
Friedrich Fritz Lang (1890–1976), Austrian-German filmmaker and screenwriter
Andrzej Frycz Modrzewski, (ca. September 20, 1503 – autumn, 1572) was a Polish Renaissance scholar, humanist and theologian, called "the father of Polish democracy".
Fritz Leiber (1910–1992), American fantasy, horror and science fiction author
Fred Fritz Peterson (born 1942), American Major League Baseball pitcher
Fritz Felix Pipes (April 1887 – ?), Austrian Olympic medalist tennis player
Fritz-Georg von Rappard (1892–1946), German Nazi general during World War II executed for war crimes 
Fritz Reichl (1890–1959), Austrian architect
Fritz Ritterbusch (1894–1946), German Nazi SS concentration camp commander executed for war crimes
Fritz Sauckel (1894–1946), German Nazi politician, executed for war crimes
Fritz Schlieper, German General in World War II
Fritz von Scholz, high-ranking member of the Waffen-SS
Fritz Steuri (1879–1950), Swiss skier and mountain guide
Fritz Strobl (born 1972), Austrian former World Cup alpine ski racer
Fritz Suhren (1908–1950), German SS Nazi concentration camp commandant executed for war crimes
Fritz Walter (1920–2002), German footballer 
Fritz Wepper (born 1941), German actor 
Fritz Wunderlich (1930–1966), German tenor
Fritz Zwicky (1898–1974), Swiss astronomer
Fritz, name given to William S. Hart's show and stunt riding horse

Nickname, ring name or code name
Fritz, nickname of Walter F. Mondale, former Vice President of the United States and U.S. senator from Minnesota
Friedrich Heinrich Karl "Fritz" Haarmann (1879–1925), prolific and cannibalistic German serial killer, rapist, and fraudster
Fritz, nickname of Ernest Hollings, former Governor of, and U.S. senator from, South Carolina
Fritz Wetherbee, New Hampshire writer and television host
Fritz Von Erich (1929–1997), ring name of American professional wrestler and promoter Jack Adkisson
Fritz or Fritzchen, German code name for Second World War Allied double agent Eddie Chapman

Fictional characters

Fritz the Cat, an anthropomorphic cat from the comic strip of the same name.
Count Fritz von Tarlenheim, in Anthony Hope's novel The Prisoner of Zenda, its sequel, Rupert of Hentzau, and various film adaptations.
Ymir Fritz, the progenitor (founding) titan from “Attack on Titan” and queen of the Eldians.
FitzChivalry Farseer, from Robin Hobb's classic Farseer Trilogy, is the illegitimate son of Prince Chivalry Farseer and a woman of the Mountain Kingdom.
Friedrich (Fritz) Von Trapp, from The Sound of Music.
Fritz, the name for a doll in the story 'Fritz' by Satyajit Ray.
Fritz, Dr Schultz's horse in Django Unchained.
Fritz, Clara's brother in the Nutcracker.
Fritz Smith, a protagonist in Five Nights at Freddy's 2.
Fritz Howard, FBI Special Agent from The Closer and later Deputy Chief of the LAPD Special Operations Bureau in Major Crimes (TV series).

See also
Fritz, a chess program
Frits, another given name
Frit, a ceramic composition

References

German masculine given names
Swiss masculine given names
Military slang and jargon
Hypocorisms
Surnames from given names